Wood County is the name of four counties in the United States:

Wood County, Ohio
Wood County, Texas
Wood County, West Virginia
Wood County, Wisconsin